A ballade (from French ballade, and German Ballade, both being words for "ballad"), in classical music since the late 18th century, refers to a setting of a literary ballad, a narrative poem, in the musical tradition of the , or to a one-movement instrumental piece with lyrical and dramatic narrative qualities reminiscent of such a song setting, especially a piano ballade.

In 19th century romantic music, a piano ballad (most often spelled ballade) is a genre of solo piano pieces written in a balletic narrative style, often with lyrical elements interspersed. This type of work made its first appearance with Chopin's Ballade No. 1 in G minor, Op. 23 of 1831–35, closely followed by the ballad included in Clara Schumann's Soirées musicales Op. 6 published in the same year.

Romantic ballades 
In late 18th century German literature, the term ballade was used to describe folklike narrative poetry (following Johann Gottfried Herder), some of which was set to music by composers such as Johann Friedrich Reichardt, Carl Friedrich Zelter, and Johann Rudolf Zumsteeg. In the nineteenth century, Robert Schumann and Carl Loewe also composed ballades.

Form
Ballades have often been characterized as "narrative" in style, "[musical] parts [that] succeed one another in a determined order... their succession is governed by the relationships of causing and resulting by necessity or probability." 

The ballade of this time varied. In Chopin, for example, the common element throughout his ballads was the metre, commonly  time. Brahms's ballades often relied on a three-part song form.

Ballades sometimes alluded to their literary predecessors. Some had obvious or supposed literary associations. For example, the four ballads of Chopin were supposedly inspired by the poetry of Adam Mickiewicz, a friend. However, no such evidence directly from the composer exists. There was, in fact, no concrete association to literature until Brahms debuted his four ballads (Op. 10), which bear the title "After the Scottish ballad 'Edward' ". However, that claim does not acknowledge the fact that in 1841, 13 years earlier than Brahms, Robert Schumann acknowledged in the Neue Zeitschrift für Musik (pp. 141–42) that Chopin told him that Chopin was inspired by poems of Mickiewicz.   

Piano ballades have been written since the 19th century; several have been composed in the 20th century (see below).

Collaborative piano ballades
The piano has also been used in works featuring other instruments, as well as voice. For example, Robert Schumann, a romantic composer and husband of Clara Schumann, wrote a set of two songs, Balladen, Op. 122 (1852–53) which were written for piano and voice. Claude Debussy, a later composer, also wrote for piano and voice with his Trois ballades de François Villon (1910).

Works for piano and orchestra also bearing the title "ballade" have been written. These include Fauré's Ballade, Op. 19, which was written in 1881, and Charles Koechlin's Ballade for piano and orchestra, Op. 50, written between 1911–1919. This work also exists as a solo work for piano.

Instrumental ballades 
In the 19th century, the title was given by Frédéric Chopin to four important, large-scale piano pieces, the Ballades Nos. 1 to 4, Opp. 23, 38, 47, 52, the first significant application of the term to instrumental music. A number of other composers subsequently used the title for piano pieces, including Johannes Brahms (the third of his Klavierstücke, Op. 118, and the set of four Ballades, Op. 10), Edvard Grieg (Ballade in the Form of Variations, Op. 24, a set of variations), Claude Debussy, Friedrich Baumfelder (for example his Two Ballades, Op. 47, and No. 2 from his Op. 285), Franz Liszt (who wrote two) and Gabriel Fauré (Op. 19, later arranged for piano and orchestra). Ballades for instruments other than the piano have also been written. 20th-century examples of the form include the three ballades of Manolis Kalomiris, the six ballades of Frank Martin (composed for instruments such as the cello, viola, flute, and saxophone), and Einojuhani Rautavaara's Ballade for Harp and Strings.  Henry Cowell wrote a ballad for string orchestra.  There are also ballads for orchestra by Grace Williams, Gottfried von Einem, Alexander Glazunov, and Kurt Atterberg, and for solo instruments and orchestra:  piano:  Ture Rangstrom, Germaine Tailleferre, Darius Milhaud, Ludomir Rozycki, and Norman Dello Joio; cello:  Heino Eller, Reinhold Gliere, and Frederic d'Erlanger;  Julius Rontgen (violin), Benjamin Britten (two pianos), Hermann Haller (horn), and Hendrik Andriessen (oboe); as well as ballads for various other combinations of instruments and voices by Gyorgy Ligeti, Eric Ewazen, Spike Milligan and Larry Stephens, Sergei Prokofiev, Ottorino Respighi, and Kurt Weill.

Examples of piano ballades
Frédéric Chopin
Ballade No. 1 in G minor, Op. 23 (1831–1835)
Ballade No. 2 in F major, Op. 38 (1836–1839)
Ballade No. 3 in A-flat major, Op. 47 (1840–1841)
Ballade No. 4 in F minor, Op. 52 (1842)
Clara Schumann, one of the 6 Soirées musicale, Ballade in D minor (1836)
César Franck, Ballade, Op. 9 (1844)
Franz Liszt
Ballade in D-flat major, (1845–48)
Ballade in B minor (1853)
Johannes Brahms, Ballades, Op. 10 (1854), consists of four ballades
Edvard Grieg, Ballade in the Form of Variations on a Norwegian Folk Song, Op. 24 (1875–76)
Gabriel Fauré, Ballade, Op. 19 (1881)
Claude Debussy, Ballade (1891, revised 1903)
Amy Beach, Ballad, Op. 6 (1894)
George Enescu, Ballade (1894)
Manuel M. Ponce, Balada Mexicana (1915)
Charles Villiers Stanford Ballade for piano in F major, Op. 148/2 (1917)
Charles Villiers Stanford Ballade for piano in G minor, Op. 170 (1919)
Alan Rawsthorne Ballade in G-sharp minor (1929)
John Ireland, Ballad (aka Ballade) (1929)
John Ireland, Ballade of London Nights (1930)
Alan Rawsthorne Ballade (1967)
Norman Demuth, Ballade triste (1941)
Alexandre Tansman, Three Ballads for piano (1942)
Humphrey Searle, Ballade for piano, Op. 10 (1947)
William Wordsworth (composer), Ballade for piano, Op. 41 (1949)
Samuel Barber, Ballade for piano, Op. 46 (1977)
Henri Pousseur, Ballade berlinoise for piano (1977)
George Perle, Ballade (1981), written for Richard Goode
David Del Tredici, Ballad in Yellow (1997)
William Bolcom, Ballade, written for Ursula Oppens, premiered January 21, 2008

References

External links 
 Analysis of Chopin's four ballades at Chopin: the poet of the piano

Ballades (music)
18th-century music genres
19th-century music genres
20th-century music genres
Song forms
Romantic music
Classical music styles